Jerry Obermueller (born October 17, 1947) is an American politician and a Republican member of the Wyoming House of Representatives representing District 56 since January 10, 2017.

Career
Prior to his election to the Wyoming House of Representatives, Obermueller was a certified public accountant in Casper.

Elections

2016
When incumbent Republican Representative Tim Stubson retired to run for the U.S. House seat being vacated by Cynthia Lummis, Obermueller announced his candidacy for the seat. He defeated Republicans Donald Bellamy and Ronna Boril in the Republican primary with 51% of the vote, and defeated Democrat Dan Neal in the general election with 60% of the vote.

2018
Obermueller defeated Kris Gaddis in the Republican primary with 75% of the vote.

References

External links
Profile from Ballotpedia

Living people
Republican Party members of the Wyoming House of Representatives
Politicians from Casper, Wyoming
1947 births
21st-century American politicians